Jalen Rashon Suggs (born June 3, 2001) is an American professional basketball player for the Orlando Magic of the National Basketball Association (NBA). He played college basketball for the Gonzaga Bulldogs. He was selected by the Magic with the fifth overall pick in the 2021 NBA draft.

Early life
Suggs was born in Saint Paul, Minnesota, to Larry Suggs and Molly Manley. Suggs' father was an accomplished local athlete. Suggs started playing basketball at an early age. In seventh grade, he played three games of junior varsity basketball for Minnehaha Academy, a private Christian school in Minneapolis, before moving to the varsity team. Suggs was a starter at the varsity level as an eighth-grade student, averaging 17.5 points, 4.4 steals, and four assists per game.

High school career
As a freshman at Minnehaha Academy, Suggs averaged 21.5 points, eight rebounds and five assists per game. He scored 22 points, including 15 in the second half, to win the Class 2A state championship over Crosby-Ironton High School. Suggs was named to the MaxPreps Freshman All-American first team. In his sophomore season, he averaged 16 points, 9.2 rebounds and 3.4 assists per game, leading his team to another Class 2A state title. Suggs earned Associated Press (AP) All-State first team and MaxPreps Sophomore All-American second team honors.

As a junior, he averaged 23.3 points, 4.7 rebounds and 6.3 assists per game, winning a third straight Class 2A state championship. Suggs was named to the AP All-State first team and MaxPreps Junior All-American third team. As a senior, he averaged 23.3 points, 7.5 rebounds, five assists and 3.9 steals per game. The school's 2019–20 season was cut short due to the COVID-19 pandemic one day after it won a section title, and the team was unable to defend its state championship. Suggs left as his school's all-time leading scorer, with 2,945 career points. Suggs earned MaxPreps All-American first team and Minnesota Mr. Basketball honors, and was named Minnesota AP Player of the Year. He was selected to play in the McDonald's All-American Game, Jordan Brand Classic and Nike Hoop Summit, but all three games were canceled due to the COVID-19 pandemic.

In addition to basketball, Suggs played the quarterback position for SMB Wolfpack, a cooperative football team representing Minnehaha Academy and three other private schools. He led his team to a Class 4A state championship as a junior in 2018. In his senior season, Suggs helped SMB finish as Class 4A runners-up and was named Minnesota Mr. Football. In his senior year, he was recognized as MaxPreps Athlete of the Year for his success in basketball and football. He became the first athlete in Minnesota history to win the state's Mr. Basketball and Mr. Football awards in the same academic school year.

Recruiting
On January 3, 2020, Suggs committed to play college basketball for Gonzaga University, choosing the Bulldogs over offers from Florida, Florida State, Iowa State and Minnesota. He became the highest ranked player to commit to the program. Suggs was a consensus five-star recruit, with ESPN considering him the fifth-best player in the 2020 class. In football, Suggs was considered a four-star dual-threat quarterback by ESPN.

College career
Suggs played for the Gonzaga Bulldogs men's basketball team in the 2020–21 NCAA Division I men's basketball season.

In his debut on November 25, 2020, Suggs recorded 24 points and eight assists in a 102–90 win over Kansas. On December 2, during a game against West Virginia, he suffered an apparent foot injury but returned later in the game. On December 19, Suggs posted a career-high 27 points, seven rebounds and four assists, shooting 7-of-10 from three-point range, in a 99–88 win over third-ranked Iowa. 

On March 9, 2021, Suggs recorded 23 points, five rebounds and five assists in an 88–78 win against BYU at the 2021 WCC tournament title game. He was named tournament most outstanding player.

As a freshman, he averaged 14.4 points, 5.3 rebounds and 4.5 assists per game and was a consensus second-team All-American. He earned First Team All-West Coast Conference (WCC), Newcomer of the Year, and All-Freshman Team honors.  He also received several player-of-the-week honors during the 2020-2021 season. On April 19, 2021, Suggs declared for the 2021 NBA draft, forgoing his remaining college eligibility.

Professional career

Orlando Magic (2021–present) 
Suggs was selected with the fifth overall pick in the 2021 NBA draft by the Orlando Magic. On August 9, he made his summer league debut in a 91–89 win against the Golden State Warriors in which he posted 24 points, nine rebounds, three blocks, and two steals in 28 minutes. On October 20, Suggs made his NBA debut, putting up 10 points in a 123–97 loss to the San Antonio Spurs. On November 29, Suggs fractured his right thumb in a 101–96 loss to the Philadelphia 76ers, finishing the game with 17 points before being removed due to the injury. He missed twenty games with the injury. After the 2021–22 season ended, Suggs underwent right ankle surgery.

On October 7, 2022, Suggs suffered a left knee capsule sprain and bone bruise after a collision with Dorian Finney-Smith during a preseason match against the Dallas Mavericks. On November 18, against the Chicago Bulls, Suggs hit the game-winning three-pointer in a 108–107 win for the Magic. On February 4, 2023, he was suspended by the NBA for one game for his role in an altercation during a game against the Minnesota Timberwolves the day before.

National team career
Suggs won a gold medal with the United States at the 2017 FIBA Under-16 Americas Championship in Formosa, Argentina. In four games, he averaged 7.5 points and 2.8 rebounds per game. At the 2018 FIBA Under-17 World Cup in Argentina, Suggs averaged 8.7 points and 3.3 steals per game and won another gold medal. He joined the United States at the 2019 FIBA Under-19 World Cup in Heraklion, Greece, averaging 9.6 points per game and helping his team win the gold medal. Suggs scored 15 points, his best mark in the tournament, in the final against Mali.

Career statistics

NBA

|-
| style="text-align:left;"| 
| style="text-align:left;"| Orlando
| 48 || 45 || 27.2 || .361 || .214 || .773 || 3.6 || 4.4 || 1.2 || .4 || 11.8
|- class="sortbottom"
| style="text-align:center;" colspan="2"| Career
| 48 || 45 || 27.2 || .361 || .214 || .773 || 3.6 || 4.4 || 1.2 || .4 || 11.8

College

|-
| style="text-align:left;"| 2020–21
| style="text-align:left;"| Gonzaga
| 30 || 30 || 28.9 || .503 || .337 || .761 || 5.3 || 4.5 || 1.9 || .3 || 14.4

Personal life 
Suggs has two younger sisters. Their father, Larry, is the second cousin of NFL player Terrell Suggs, a two-time Super Bowl champion. Jalen is also a cousin of Eddie Jones, a three-time NBA All-Star. He has several other cousins that have played NCAA Division I basketball. Suggs is dating Louisville Cardinals women's basketball guard Hailey Van Lith. His other cousin, Tyrese Haliburton is a player for the  Indiana Pacers. Suggs is a Christian.

References

External links
Gonzaga Bulldogs bio
USA Basketball bio

2001 births
Living people
All-American college men's basketball players
American men's basketball players
Basketball players from Saint Paul, Minnesota
Gonzaga Bulldogs men's basketball players
McDonald's High School All-Americans
Orlando Magic draft picks
Orlando Magic players
Point guards
Shooting guards